Blackaby is a surname. Notable people with the surname include:

Ethan Blackaby (born 1940), American baseball player
Henry Blackaby, American Christian writer and pastor
Luke Blackaby (born 1991), English cricketer